The Liberian ambassador in Beijing is the official representative of the Government in Monrovia to the Government of the People's Republic of China.

The governments in Taipei and Monrovia recognized each other in the periods of 1957 to 1977, 1989 to 1993 and 1997 to 2003.

List of representatives

References 

 
China
Liberia